63rd General Assembly of Nova Scotia is the assembly of the Nova Scotia House of Assembly that was determined in the 2017 Nova Scotia election. The assembly opened on June 16, 2017, and was dissolved July 17, 2021.

Seating plan

List of members

Membership changes in the 63rd Assembly

References

63
2017 establishments in Nova Scotia
2017 in Nova Scotia
2018 in Nova Scotia
2019 in Nova Scotia
2020 in Nova Scotia
2017 in Canadian politics
2018 in Canadian politics
2019 in Canadian politics
2020 in Canadian politics